Percy Ronald Stevens (1893–1963) was a notable New Zealand mechanic and radio broadcaster. He was born in Napier, Hawke's Bay, New Zealand in 1893.

References

1893 births
1963 deaths
New Zealand broadcasters
People from Napier, New Zealand